The 19th Annual Screen Actors Guild Awards, honoring the best achievements in film and television performances for the year 2012, were presented on January 27, 2013, at the Shrine Exposition Center in Los Angeles for the seventeenth consecutive year. It was broadcast simultaneously by TNT and TBS, which collectively gained 5.2 million viewers, leading the two networks to sign a three-year television contract with SAG-AFTRA. The nominees were announced on December 12, 2012.

Dick Van Dyke was announced as the 2012 SAG Life Achievement Award honoree on August 21, 2012.

Winners and nominees
Winners are listed first and highlighted in boldface.

Film

Television

Screen Actors Guild Life Achievement Award
 Dick Van Dyke

In Memoriam
Jessica Chastain introduced a previously recorded "In Memoriam" segment, which honored the life and career of the actors who died in 2012:

Ben Gazzara
George Lindsey
Lupe Ontiveros
Deborah Raffin
Peter Breck
Larry Hagman
Whitney Houston
Alex Karras
Martha Greenhouse
Susan Tyrrell
Al Freeman Jr.
Gary Collins
Nicol Williamson
Robert Hegyes
Ron Palillo
Jack Klugman
Herbert Lom
Conrad Bain
Yale Summers
Ann Rutherford
Jonathan Frid
Harry Carey Jr.
Chad Everett
Celeste Holm
Sherman Hemsley
James Farentino
Tony Epper
Michael Clarke Duncan
Russell Means
Warren Stevens
Frank Cady
Charles Durning
Yvette Wilson
William Windom
Davy Jones
Kathryn Joosten
Phyllis Diller
Richard Dawson
Dick Clark
Andy Griffith
Ernest Borgnine

See also
 2nd AACTA International Awards
 65th Primetime Emmy Awards
 66th British Academy Film Awards
 70th Golden Globe Awards
 85th Academy Awards

References

External links

 19th Screen Actors Guild Awards  at the Internet Movie Database

2012
Screen
Screen
Screen
Screen
2013 in California
January 2013 events in the United States